Arthur's Nose is a 1976 children's book written and illustrated by writer Marc Brown, focusing on the experiences of Arthur Read, a fictional anthropomorphic bipedal aardvark.  The character of Arthur later acquired fame and inspired several other picture books and the long-running PBS animated television series adaptation.

Plot

Arthur is a young anthropomorphic aardvark residing in a world populated by anthropomorphic animals. Francine Frensky,  his classmate, starts to complain of his nose and also frequently complains about Arthur's lengthy nose, as she is seated nearby, and a few other remarks regarding the length of his nose inspire Arthur to have it fixed.  He visits a specialist, but decides against the idea of changing his nose even after viewing the man's other options. Arthur returns to school and is seldom taunted because of his nose, although Francine still complains mildly about it getting in her way.

Later books
After the book's publication, it inspired a series of storybooks chronicling Arthur's childhood experiences.  The books showed the progression of years Arthur's character design gradually changed. In earlier books, he—and his family—were an aardvark (a real one with a long snout, aardvark paws and claws, and a tail). But in later books and the TV series, their noses (aardvark snouts) eventually and gradually receded until they were reduced to nothing more to a pair of tiny nostrils and their tails also disappeared.  Arthur later acquired a pair of eyeglasses, although he got the glasses from the next book Arthur's Eyes because he couldn't see. Marc Brown's depictions of the other characters also slowly changed and shifted, as did his drawing style. The series would later go on to inspire a popular PBS educational animated television series.

The book was reissued in 2001 to mark its 25th anniversary, with additional drawings showing how Brown developed the character.

References

1976 children's books
American picture books